Robin Smith (August 17, 1952 – May 1, 2009) was an American chess player and writer. He held the ICCF title of Correspondence Chess Grandmaster (GM), was a two-time US Correspondence Chess Champion, and author of the book Modern Chess Analysis. His last and highest ICCF rating was 2642, which he achieved in only 64 games from 1997 to 2008.

Books

References

External links 
 
 
 
 2006 photograph of Robin Smith

1952 births
2009 deaths
American chess players
American chess writers
American male non-fiction writers
20th-century chess players
20th-century American male writers
Correspondence chess grandmasters